Puding Diraja (Pahang Hilir: Pudéang Deghaje) also known as Royal Pudding, this dessert was developed and served to the royal family of Pahang state.

Its basic ingredients are pisang lemak manis (a local cultivar of banana), evaporated milk, prunes, candied cherries and cashew nuts. The pudding is garnished with jala mas and served with a cold sauce made from milk and cornflour. Nowadays it is popularly served during Ramadan as well as a special afternoon tea treat for the family on weekends.

See also
 Cuisine of Malaysia

References

Malay cuisine
Snack foods